Alcoa Care-free Home is a historic home located at Brighton in Monroe County, New York. It was designed by Charles M. Goodman (1906 – 1992) and is one of 24 Alcoa Care-free Homes listed in their sales brochure of 1957 that were built for a demonstration project and the only one located New York State. It is of post and beam construction with a shallow pitched, side gabled roof. It features end walls constructed completely of plate glass framed by aluminum and supported by wood columns that are clad in aluminum.

It was listed on the National Register of Historic Places in 2010.

See also 
 Alcoa Care-free Homes
 Hollin Hills Historic District
 Green Machine / Blue Space, another experimental home in New York

References

External links 
 Alcoa Care-Free Home
 Friends of The Alcoa Care-Free Home

Houses on the National Register of Historic Places in New York (state)
Houses completed in 1957
Houses in Monroe County, New York
Ranch house architecture
Alcoa
National Register of Historic Places in Monroe County, New York